The 2014 San Luis Potosí Challenger was a professional tennis tournament played on clay courts. It was the 20th edition of the tournament which was part of the 2014 ATP Challenger Tour. It took place in San Luis Potosí, Mexico between 14 and 19 April 2014.

Singles main-draw entrants

Seeds

Other entrants
The following players received wildcards into the singles main draw:
  Lucas Gómez
  Alan Núñez Aguilera
  Marcello Amador
  Tigre Hank

The following players received entry from the qualifying draw:
  Dean O'Brien
  César Ramírez
  Chris Letcher
  Mauricio Echazú

Doubles main-draw entrants

Seeds

Other entrants
The following pairs received wildcards into the doubles main draw:
 Miguel Gallardo Valles /  Alan Núñez Aguilera
 Lucas Gómez /  Andres Zepeda
 Tigre Hank /  Manuel Sánchez

Champions

Singles

 Paolo Lorenzi def.  Adrián Menéndez Maceiras, 6–1, 6–3

Doubles

 Kevin King /  Juan Carlos Spir def.  Adrián Menéndez Maceiras /  Agustín Velotti, 6–3, 6–4

External links
Official website

San Luis Potosi Challenger
San Luis Potosí Challenger
San Luis Potosi Challenger